The Redding Record Searchlight is a newspaper serving Redding, California. It has a daily circulation of about 30,000 and hosts a Redding news Web site, Redding.com.

History 
On October 17, 1938, the John P. Scripps Newspaper Group published the first edition of the Redding Record, which after a series of acquisitions became the region's dominant daily newspaper under the nameplate Redding Record Searchlight.

References

External links 
 

1938 establishments in California
Daily newspapers published in California
Gannett publications
Newspapers established in 1938
Redding, California